Maria Estela Estévez Barreiro (born 24 February 1965 in Vigo) is a retired Spanish athlete who competed in middle-distance events and the cross-country. She represented her country at the 1992 Summer Olympics as well as two World Championships.

Competition record

Personal bests
Outdoor
1500 metres – 4:13.93 (Tokyo 1991)
3000 metres – 8:56.81 (Nice 1993)
5000 metres – 15:43.86 (Seville 1990)

References

1965 births
Living people
Sportspeople from Vigo
Sportspeople from Galicia (Spain)
Spanish female middle-distance runners
Olympic athletes of Spain
Athletes (track and field) at the 1992 Summer Olympics
World Athletics Championships athletes for Spain
Athletes (track and field) at the 1993 Mediterranean Games
Mediterranean Games competitors for Spain
20th-century Spanish women